Olivier Jacquemond (born 1980) is a French novelist, essayist and poet.

His novel, New York Fantasy, was published by Mercure de France (part of the Éditions Gallimard publishing group) in 2009. The protagonist is a young Frenchman who comes to New York. Jacquemond says that he wrote, "a novel about 9/11 that never speaks directly about 9/11".

He is also the author of two collections of poetry ("Toit, Twin Towers" (Le Regard du texte, 2008) and "Blanchatre" (Centre Vendôme pour les Arts plastiques, 2003), and a series of essays ("The Three Secrets", published by Sens & Tonka 2004, 2006), and a novel called "Acrylique" (Sens + Tonka, 2002), also published in Italian.

The French daily Le Figaro noted that "Jacquemond's writing works because it is sincere, a style that finds the right distance between melancholy and lucidity."

Jacquemond has a doctorate in philosophy from the University of Paris (L'Université Paris 7) on the subject of friendship and was a visiting researcher at Columbia University in New York. He currently writes and teaches in Paris.

External links
Reviews of "New York Fantasy"
 Chroniques de la rentrée littéraire
 Livres Hebdo
Interviews with Author
 Interview on Daily Motion
"Acrylique" (Novella)
 Radio interview on France Culture
 Review of Italian translation by Galassia Libri

References

1980 births
21st-century French novelists
Living people
Writers from Paris
University of Paris alumni
French poets
French male essayists
French male poets
French male novelists
21st-century French essayists
21st-century French male writers